Rameesh Kailasam (Ramesh Kailasam) is currently the President & CEO of IndiaTech.org, a think tank and industry group set up by Indian startup founders and funds for supporting internet-based startups and is considered as the emerging voice of the Indian startups in the internet space.

In 2015, he was awarded the Young Achiever award by the Institute of Cost Accountants of India, under Ministry of Corporate Affairs for his work towards promoting Good Governance at Government and Corporate levels.

He is a regular columnist in prominent Indian newspapers and appears on Indian television on policy discussions. He has also proposed to government of India various enabling regulations in the startup space including emerging areas such as gaming and cryptocurrency.

Prior to joining IndiaTech.org, he was Managing Director at APCO Worldwide heading the firm's India operations across different sectors on matters of policy and advocacy and established the public affairs practice for the firm in India. Prior to APCO, he served as vice-president for Governmental Programs at IBM for India & South Asia, where he represented the company in a number of policy engagements with the Government. Prior to this he worked with Applied Materials and also worked closely on India's semiconductor and solar policies including the creation of India's National Solar Mission. Prior to this he served at the Oracle-HP e-governance Center of Excellence wherein he supported the creation of a number of e-governance policies and national mission mode projects with a number of governments in India and overseas.

He has been involved in the creation of next generation administrative reforms and e-Governance in various States and Central Government in India, and was actively involved in the set-up and running of the Centre for Good Governance at the Government of Andhra Pradesh. Through this Centre, he drove various governance reforms in Financial Accountability, Finance, Urban, Rural governance, Health, Education and governance reforms. He was also involved in building a number of applications and pilots around mobile phones for governments from 2005 onwards.

He is a visiting guest faculty on Governance reforms, policy making and advocacy at various reputed Institutions in India like Indian Institute of Management, Management Development Institute, Institute of Chartered Financial Analysts of India, Indian School of Public Policy & OPJGU including lectures at various international forums such as World Fiduciary Forum of World Bank, Commonwealth Association for Public Administration and Management, WEF and UN organizations. He has authored more than 200 papers and reports many of which have been adopted for driving policy not only in India, but also in other countries. He has over 20+ years of experience in the policy and advocacy space. Rameesh holds multiple qualifications in Accounting, Finance, Technology, as well as policy and governance reforms.

References

Indian accountants
Writers from Jharkhand
Living people
People from Jamshedpur
Year of birth missing (living people)